Castle Rock, originally known as La Centinela (The Sentinel), is a pillar in Corral Hollow, in San Joaquin County, California.

La Centinela was a site used by bands of the horse gang of Joaquin Murrieta, to gather droves of wild and stolen horses from the plain beyond Corral Hollow for the next drove to Sonora.  It also allowed the gang to overlook the route miners used to return from the Tuolumne River mines through the Livermore Valley on their way to San Francisco.  Isolated individuals would be ambushed, killed and robbed, the bodies dragged out of sight.

References 

Landforms of San Joaquin County, California
Diablo Range